Le Roy Township is a township in Coffey County, Kansas, United States. As of the 2000 census, its population was 669.

Geography
According to the USGS, it contains one cemetery, Le Roy.

The streams of Crooked Creek and Duck Creek run through this township.

Transportation
Le Roy Township contains one airport or landing strip, Leroy Airport.

References
 USGS Geographic Names Information System (GNIS)

External links
 US-Counties.com
 City-Data.com

Townships in Coffey County, Kansas
Townships in Kansas